Somanathapura, also spelled Somanathpur, Somnathpur, or Somanathpura, is a town and Grama Panchayat in Tirumakudalu Narasipura, Mysore district in the state of Karnataka in India.

Demographics 
According to the 2011 Indian Census, the town consists of 4,692 people. The town has a literacy rate of 86.11 percent which is higher than Karnataka's average of 75.36 percent.

References

External links

 Somnathpur.com
 Somanathapura description

Tourism in Karnataka
Cities and towns in Mysore district